The Bécourt Military Cemetery is a cemetery located in the Somme region of France commemorating British and Commonwealth soldiers who fought in the Battle of the Somme in World War I. The cemetery contains those who died in a variety of dates from August 1915 to April 1917 manning the front line near the village of Becordel-Becourt and is managed by the Commonwealth War Graves Commission.

Location 
The cemetery is located on the southern side of the Rue de Becourt, the road linking the village of Becourt to the town of Albert, France. It is on the western edge of Becourt Wood. The village of Becourt is located approximately 2 kilometers east of Albert.

Establishment of the Cemetery

History 
The cemetery was begun in August 1915 by the 51st Highland Division and was used by other divisions near the front line until the beginning of the Battle of the Somme in July 1916. During and after the battle, until April 1917, the cemetery was used by nearby field ambulances. In August 1918, Plot II was started by the 18th Division. Three German graves have been removed from the cemetery since its inception.

Layout 
The cemetery covers an area of 4327 square meters and is enclosed by a rubble wall.

Statistics 
There are a total of 713 World War I casualties buried in the cemetery, of which 5 are unidentified. A special memorial is dedicated to a British soldier believed to be buried among the unknown.

Eighteen Yorkshire Regiment soldiers are buried in the cemetery, including 12 officers.

References 

World War I cemeteries in France
Cemeteries in Somme (department)